Nestor Soriano (16 October 1953 – 3 September 2021) was a Filipino sailor. He competed in the Finn event at the 1988 Summer Olympics.

Soriano died of complications from COVID-19 in September 2021.

References

1953 births
2021 deaths
Filipino male sailors (sport)
Olympic sailors of the Philippines
Sailors at the 1988 Summer Olympics – Finn
Deaths from the COVID-19 pandemic in the Philippines
Sportspeople from Antique (province)